Pallanganmiddang (Balangamida) is an extinct Aboriginal language of the Upper Murray region of the north east of  Victoria (Australia).

The language is not highly similar to any other. Minjambuta may have been a dialect. It has been suggested that the language may be slightly similar to Yota-Yota, Dhudhuroa and several Wiradjuri dialects.

Phonology

Sounds 

Vowels may be /a i u/.

Bibliography 
 Blake, Barry and Reid, Julie. Pallanganmiddang: A Language of the Upper Murray. Aboriginal History, Vol. 23, 1999: 15-31.

References

Gippsland languages
Extinct languages of Victoria (Australia)